Stuart Island State Park in San Juan County, Washington is a marine camping park in the Washington State Park System.

Activities and amenities
The park has  of saltwater shoreline with moorage at Reid Harbor and Prevost Harbor. The park is part of the Cascadia Marine Trail; some of its 18 primitive campsites are reserved for boaters arriving by other than motorized means.

References

External links
Stuart Island Marine State Park Washington State Parks and Recreation Commission

State parks of Washington (state)
Parks in San Juan County, Washington
Protected areas established in 1952